Bugamba is an urban centre in the Western Region of Uganda. It is one of the trading centres in Mbarara District.

Location

The geographical coordinates of Bugamba are:0°43'57.0"S, 30°30'58.0"E (Latitude:-0.732500; Longitude:30.516111).

Overview
Bugamba Trading Centre hosts the headquarters of Bugamba sub-county, which, according to the 2014 national population census and household survey, was home to 35,202 people, of whom 18,066 were female and 17,136 were male.

Prominent people
Bugamba is te birthplace of Francis K. Butagira, a lawyer, judge, politician and former ambassador. He served as Uganda's Ambassador to Austria, Ethiopia, Kenya, Germany, the United Nations and the Vatican.

References

External links
 Mbarara District Local Government Statistical Abstract 2016/17

Populated places in Western Region, Uganda
Cities in the Great Rift Valley
Mbarara District